A disposable (also called disposable product) is a product designed for a single use after which it is recycled or is disposed as solid waste. The term is also sometimes used for products that may last several months (e.g. disposable air filters) to distinguish from similar products that last indefinitely (e.g. washable air filters). The word "disposables" is not to be confused with the word "consumables", which is widely used in the mechanical world. For example, welders consider welding rods, tips, nozzles, gas, etc. to be "consumables", as they last only a certain amount of time before needing to be replaced. Consumables are needed for a process to take place, such as inks for printing and welding rods for welding, while disposable products are products that can be thrown away after it becomes damaged or otherwise unuseful.

Etymology
"Disposable" is an adjective meaning something not reusable but is disposed of after use. Many people now use the term as a noun or substantive, i.e. "a disposable" but in reality this is still an adjective as the noun (product, nappy, etc.) is implied.

Disposable income is the amount of money left over from one's salary or pay for spending, saving or whatever, after all living costs have been taken out; this term uses the word "disposable" in a different sense, as the money is available to be "disposed" (i.e. allocated or committed) freely according to one's discretion.

Materials
Disposable products are most often made from paper, plastic, cotton, or polystyrene foam.  Products made from composite materials such as laminations are difficult to recycle and are more likely to be disposed of at the end of their use.They are typically disposed of using landfills because it is a cheap option. But in 2004 the European Union passed a law where they stopped allowing disposals in landfills.

In 2021, Australia's Minderoo Foundation produced a report called the "Plastic Waste Makers Index" concluding that half of the world's single-use plastic waste is produced by just 20 companies. China is the biggest consumer of single-use plastics.

Examples of disposables

Kitchen and dining products

 Aluminum foil and aluminum pans
 Disposable dishware / drinkware (e.g. plates, bowls, cups)
 Plastic cutlery (e.g. spoons, knives, forks, sporks)
 Disposable table cloth
 Cupcake wrappers, coffee filters are compostable
 Drinking straws

Packaging

Packages are usually intended for a single use. The waste hierarchy calls for minimization of materials.  Many packages and materials are suited to recycling, although the actual recycling percentages are relatively low in many regions. For example, in Chile, only 1% of plastic is recycled. Reuse and repurposing of packaging is increasing, but eventually containers will be recycled, composted, incinerated, or landfilled.

There are many container forms such as boxes, bottles, jars, bags, etc.  Materials include paper, plastics, metals, fabrics, composites, etc.

Food service industry disposables

In 2002, Taiwan began taking action to reduce the use of disposable tableware at institutions and businesses, and to reduce the use of plastic bags. Yearly, the nation of 17.7 million people was producing 59,000 tons of disposable tableware waste and 105,000 tons of waste plastic bags, and increasing measures have been taken in the years since then to reduce the amount of waste. In 2013 Taiwan's Environmental Protection Administration (EPA) banned outright the use of disposable tableware in the nation's 968 schools, government agencies and hospitals.  The ban is expected to eliminate 2,600 metric tons of waste yearly.

In Germany, Austria, and Switzerland, laws banning use of disposable food and drink containers at large-scale events have been enacted. Such a ban has been in place in Munich, Germany, since 1991, applying to all city facilities and events. This includes events of all sizes, including very large ones (Christmas market, Auer-Dult Faire, Oktoberfest and Munich City Marathon). For small events of a few hundred people, the city has arranged for a corporation offer rental of crockery and dishwasher equipment. In part through this regulation, Munich reduced the waste generated by Oktoberfest, which attracts tens of thousands of people, from 11,000 metric tons in 1990 to 550 tons in 1999.

China produces about 57 billion pairs of single-use chopsticks yearly, of which half are exported. About 45 percent are made from trees – about 3.8 million of them – mainly cotton wood, birch, and spruce, the remainder being made from bamboo. Japan uses about 24 billion pairs of these disposables per year, and globally the use is about 80 billion pairs are thrown away by about 1.4 million people. Reusable chopsticks in restaurants have a lifespan of 130 meals. In Japan, with disposable ones costing about 2 cents and reusable ones costing typically $1.17, the reusables better the $2.60 breakeven cost. Campaigns in several countries to reduce this waste are beginning to have some effect.

Israel is considered the world's largest user of disposables food containers and dinnerware. Each month, 250 million plastic cups and more than 12 million paper cups are used, manufactured and disposed. In Israel there are no laws about manufacturing or importing of food disposable containers.

A kulhar  is a traditional handle-less clay cup from South Asia that is typically unpainted and unglazed, and meant to be disposable. Since kulhars are made by firing in a kiln and are almost never reused, they are inherently sterile and hygienic. Bazaars and food stalls in the Indian subcontinent traditionally served hot beverages, such as tea, in kuhlars, which suffused the beverage with an "earthy aroma" that was often considered appealing. Yoghurt, hot milk with sugar as well as some regional desserts, such as kulfi (traditional ice-cream), are also served in kulhars. Kulhars have gradually given way to polystyrene and coated paper cups, because the latter are lighter to carry in bulk and cheaper.⁠⁠

Medical and hygiene products

Medical and surgical device manufacturers worldwide produce a multitude of items that are intended for one use only. The primary reason is infection control; when an item is used only once it cannot transmit infectious agents to subsequent patients. Manufacturers of any type of medical device are obliged to abide by numerous standards and regulations. ISO 15223: Medical Devices and EN 980 cite that single use instruments or devices be labelled as such on their packaging with a universally recognized symbol to denote "do not re-use", "single use", or "use only once". This symbol is the numeral 2, within a circle with a 45° line through it.

Examples of single use items include:
 Hypodermic needles
 Toilet paper
 Disposable towels, paper towels
 Condoms and other contraception products
 Disposable enemas and similar products
 Cotton swabs and pads
 Medical and cleaning gloves
 Medical dust respirators (dust masks)
 Baby and adult diapers, and training pants
 Shaving razors, safety razors, waxing kits, combs, and other hair control products
 Toothbrushes, dental floss, and other oral care products
 Hospital aprons 
 Disposable panties in postpartum
 Contact lenses

Electronics

 Non-rechargeable batteries are considered hazardous waste and should only be disposed of as such.
 Disposable ink cartridges
 Disposable cameras 
Ecigarette devices, coils/ Disposable tanks/pods

Defense and law enforcement
 PlastiCuffs

Other consumer products

 Garbage bags 
 Vacuum cleaner bags, water, air, coolant, and other filters
 Paper currency, withdrawn from circulation when worn
 Ballpoint pens, erasers, and other writing implements
 Movie sets and theater sets
Gift wrapping paper
Labels, stickers, and the associated release liners are single use and usually disposed after use.
Cigarettes and cigars, plus cigarette packets, filters and rolling paper.

Laws and policies 
Many governments are scaling up their efforts to phase out single-use plastic packaging and to manage plastic packaging waste in an environmentally sound manner. A number of countries have legislation to ensure that plastic packaging waste collected from households is sorted, reprocessed, compounded, and reused or recycled. There are also bans on single-use plastic food packaging in many countries.

See also
 Disposable tableware
 Durability
 Durable good
 Extended producer responsibility
 Litter
 Paper napkin
 Paper recycling
 Planned obsolescence
 Plastic recycling
 Reusable shopping bag
 Waste management
 Société Bic
 Single Use Plastic Deathbed

References

Sources

External links

 How disposable chopsticks are made (video).

Home
Waste management
 
Pollution